Kiyo A. Matsumoto (born August 29, 1955) is a Senior United States district judge of the United States District Court for the Eastern District of New York.

Early life and education
Born in Raleigh, North Carolina, Matsumoto graduated from the University of California, Berkeley with her Bachelor of Arts degree in 1976 and later from the Georgetown University Law Center with a Juris Doctor in 1981.

Legal career
Matsumoto was a private practice attorney in Washington state from 1981 to 1983 before joining the United States Attorney's Office as Assistant United States Attorney for the Eastern District of New York from 1983 to 2004. Matsumoto served as an adjunct professor of law at New York University School of Law from 1998 to 2004.

Federal judicial career
From 2004 to 2008, Matsumoto served as a United States magistrate judge in the Eastern District of New York. In 2008, Matsumoto was nominated to the U.S. District Court for the Eastern District of New York by President George W. Bush on March 11, 2008, to a seat vacated by Edward R. Korman. Matsumoto was confirmed by the Senate on July 17, 2008, on a majority vote and received commission on July 22, 2008. She assumed senior status on July 23, 2022.

Born to second-generation Japanese American parents, Matsumoto became the second Asian Pacific American woman to serve as a federal district court judge.

Matsumoto presided over the Martin Shkreli securities fraud trial.

See also
List of Asian American jurists

References

External links

Living people
1955 births
American jurists of Japanese descent
Assistant United States Attorneys
Georgetown University Law Center alumni
Judges of the United States District Court for the Eastern District of New York
New York University School of Law faculty
United States district court judges appointed by George W. Bush
21st-century American judges
University of California, Berkeley alumni
People from Raleigh, North Carolina
United States magistrate judges
American women legal scholars
21st-century American women judges